Urrao Airport  is an airport serving Urrao, a town in the Antioquia Department of Colombia. The runway and town are in an elevated mountain valley on the eastern bank of the small Penderisco River, an eventual tributary of the Atrato River.

See also

Transport in Colombia
List of airports in Colombia

References

External links
OurAirports - Urrao
FallingRain - Urrao

Airports in Colombia